2017 FC Tokyo U-23 season.

J3 League

References

External links
 J.League official site

FC Tokyo U-23
FC Tokyo U-23 seasons